Romuald Giegiel (born 8 May 1957 in Warsaw) is a retired hurdler from Poland. He won two medals at the European Indoor Championships.

Biography

International competitions

References

1957 births
Living people
Athletes from Warsaw
Polish male hurdlers
20th-century Polish people